Windhoek Central Business District (short: Windhoek Central) is the inner city area of Windhoek, capital of Namibia. It is surrounded by the suburbs of Windhoek West and Hochland Park in the west, Windhoek-North in the north, Eros, Klein-Windhoek, Luxushügel and Auasblick in the east, and Suiderhof and Southern Industrial in the south.

Windhoek Central consists of residential and business properties as well as public spaces. Most of Windhoek's governmental and administrative buildings are situated here. The name addition Business District refers to the possibility to apply for business rights which is generally granted for erven in Windhoek that are situated in any proclaimed business district.

Important buildings, roads and places 

 Independence Avenue
 Alte Feste
 Christ Church
 St. Mary's Cathedral
 Zoo Park
 Tintenpalast
 Supreme Court of Namibia
 Windhoek Railway Station

Geography of Windhoek